Micah Awe (born January 4, 1994) is a Nigerian-born Canadian football linebacker for the Calgary Stampeders of the Canadian Football League (CFL). He played college football at Texas Tech. Awe has also been a member of the Tampa Bay Buccaneers, New York Jets, Toronto Argonauts, Winnipeg Blue Bombers, Ottawa Redblacks, BC Lions, and Montreal Alouettes.

College career 
Awe accumulated 171 solo tackles over 51 games for the Texas Tech Red Raiders including 77 stops as a senior and defensive captain in 2015.

Professional career

Tampa Bay Buccaneers 
Awe was signed by the Tampa Bay Buccaneers following the team's rookie mini-camp in May 2016. After not making the final 53-man roster Awe was signed to the Buccaneers' practice squad on September 5, 2016. He was cut from the Buc's practice roster only 5 days later on September 10.

BC Lions 
On March 7, 2017, Awe and the BC Lions of the Canadian Football League agreed to a contract. In one season with the Lions, Awe recorded 54 defensive tackles, 16 special teams tackles and one forced fumble. On January 31, 2018 the Lions released Awe so he could sign with the New York Jets.

New York Jets
On February 1, 2018, Awe signed with the New York Jets of the NFL. He was waived by the Jets on April 28, 2018.

BC Lions (II) 
On August 20, 2018, it was announced that Awe had re-signed with the BC Lions. In seven games, Awe made 31 defensive tackles, as well as three special teams tackles.

Toronto Argonauts 
On February 13, 2019, Awe signed a one-year contract with the Toronto Argonauts. He played in ten games for the Argonauts in 2019, recording 44 defensive tackles, six special teams tackles, one sack, and one interception.

Winnipeg Blue Bombers 
On February 18, 2020, it was announced that Awe had signed with the Winnipeg Blue Bombers to a two-year contract. However, he did not play in 2020 due to the cancellation of the 2020 CFL season and was released by the Blue Bombers on January 31, 2021.

Ottawa Redblacks 
On February 12, 2021, Awe was signed by the Ottawa Redblacks. He played in all 14 regular season games where he had 74 defensive tackles and three sacks. He became a free agent upon the expiry of his contract on February 8, 2022.

BC Lions (III) 
After the start of training camps around the league, Awe signed with the BC Lions for a third time on May 21, 2022. He played in one game for the Lions before asking for his release when it was apparent that he would not be a starter with the club. He was granted his release on June 23, 2022.

Montreal Alouettes 
On July 6, 2022, immediately after the firing of head coach Khari Jones, general manager and new head coach Danny Maciocia announced that Awe had signed a contract with the Montreal Alouettes. After dressing as a backup in his first game with the team on July 14, 2022, against the Edmonton Elks, he started at linebacker for the next 12 games of the regular season and recorded 47 defensive tackles, three special teams tackles, one interception, and one forced fumble. However, he suffered a shoulder injury and did not play in the final regular season game nor the two playoff games for the team that year. Awe became a free agent upon the expiry of his contract on February 14, 2023.

Calgary Stampeders
On February 17, 2023, it was announced that Awe had signed with the Calgary Stampeders.

Personal life 
Awe was born in Lagos, Nigeria but moved to the United States when he was three years old. He has three siblings. Awe's mother graduated with her masters from Texas Tech University and his father graduated with his masters in Criminology and Criminal Justice from the University of Texas at Arlington.

References

External links 
Calgary Stampeders bio
Texas Tech bio
Tampa Bay Buccaneers bio

1994 births
Living people
American football linebackers
BC Lions players
Calgary Stampeders players
New York Jets players
Nigerian players of American football
Nigerian players of Canadian football
Nigerian emigrants to the United States
Ottawa Redblacks players
Players of American football from Texas
Sportspeople from Arlington, Texas
Sportspeople from Lagos
Tampa Bay Buccaneers players
Texas Tech Red Raiders football players
Toronto Argonauts players
Winnipeg Blue Bombers players